Kozlovsky (masculine) or Kozlovskaya (feminine) is a Russian surname. Notable people with the surname include:

Aleksey Kozlovsky (1905–1977), Russian composer
Alexander Kozlovsky, several people
Danila Kozlovsky (born 1985), Russian actor
Dmitrii Kozlovskii
Eugene Kozlovsky (born 1946), Russian writer, journalist
Fyodor Kozlovsky (died 1770), Russian writer
Ivan Kozlovsky (1900–1993), Soviet singer (tenor)
Marina Kozlovskaya (1925–2019), Soviet Russian painter
Mikhail Kozlovsky (1753–1802), Russian sculptor
Osip Kozlovsky (1757–1831), Russian composer
Pavel Alexandrovich Kozlovsky, Russian general
Pavel Pavlovich Kozlovsky (born 1942), Soviet and Belarusian general and politician
Pyotr Kozlovsky (1783–1840), Russian diplomat and man of letters
Serhiy Kozlovskyy (Kozlovsky) (born 1986), Ukrainian historian, journalist
Stanislav Kozlovsky, contributor to the Russian computer magazine Computerra who wrote an article on Ithkuil, a constructed language
Valentina Kozlovskaya (born 1938), Russian chess player
Vikenty Kozlovsky, Russian general
Ondřej Kozlovský (born 1982), Czech bobsledder
Radim Kozlovský, paraplegic Czech athlete who participated in the 2006 Winter Paralympic Games in Turin

See also
Kozlovsky (disambiguation)
Kozłowski, a Polish last name

Russian-language surnames

de:Koslowski
fr:Kozlovski